The EuroBasket Women 2011 final was played at the Arena Łódź in Łódź, Poland, on 3 July 2011, between Russia and Turkey. Russia won the match 59−42 and became European champions. This match was Turkey's first final.

Road to the final

The match

Summary
The final was played between Russia and Turkey in Arena Łódź, and was followed by about 5,000 spectators. It was Russia's sixth final after the dissolution of the Soviet Union, while Turkey played for the first time in a continental final.

Early in the game the Russians made a decent advantage of 10 points preventing the Turkish players of scoring from outside. The only highlight in the Turkish team was Birsel Vardarlı whose play was enough only by trailing the first quarter by 19–8. In the second period Russia reached a 16-points advantage, followed with a consolidation in the Turkish team who came up with storming triples by Bahar Caglar and Şaziye İvegin-Karslı to cut the gap to five points with a 15–4 run. However the Russians played better at the end and with a triple by Olga Arteshina restored the advantage of the first period with a half-time result of 33–23.

The second half started with an equal play and Russia firmly maintained and even raised their advantage after the third quarter when the result was 46–34 that seemed to be a key for the outcome in the final. The Turkish team couldn't find their play in the whole second half making no impression at all, while the Russians finished the final with another period won. The final result was 59–42 in favor of Russia, and it was Russia's third title in the competition and first since 2007.

Details

References 

final
2010–11 in Russian basketball
2010–11 in Turkish basketball
Russia women's national basketball team games
Turkey women's national basketball team games
2011